Gunter d'Alquen (24 October 1910 – 15 May 1998) was chief editor of the weekly Das Schwarze Korps ("The Black Corps"), the official newspaper of the Schutzstaffel (SS), and commander of the SS-Standarte Kurt Eggers.

Early life 
Gunter d'Alquen was born to a Catholic-Freemason wool merchant and reserve officer named Carl d'Alquen, in Essen on 24 October 1910. He attended grammar school in Essen and joined the Hitler Youth in 1925. In 1927, d'Alquen became a member of the SA and as a 16-year-old joined the NSDAP.

D'Alquen was active in the National Socialist German Student Union. He became a member of the SS on 10 April 1931. He did not complete his studies in history and philology and instead turned to a journalistic career. From 1932, he was a political correspondent to the editorial board of the Völkischer Beobachter ("Völkisch Observer"). It was here he aroused the attention of Heinrich Himmler, who appointed him chief editor of Das Schwarze Korps in March 1935.

As chief editor 
d'Alquen's newspaper often attacked intellectuals, students, Freemasons, certain scientists, rebellious businessmen, traffickers, clerics and other representatives of German society that had aroused Himmler's anger. With its notorious anti-Semitism, Das Schwarze Korps established itself as a moral spokesperson of Nazi beliefs.

From September 1939, d'Alquen became a prominent SS war correspondent. He was appointed head of the propaganda formation SS-Standarte Kurt Eggers named after Kurt Eggers, a friend of d'Alquen, an SS war correspondent and editor of Das Schwarze Korps who was killed in action in 1943.

As a prisoner of war 
In May 1945, d'Alquen was taken as a prisoner of war by the British Army. He was held at Camp 18, a prisoner-of-war camp on the grounds of Featherstone Castle in Northumberland, England. D'Alquen was released from custody in 1948.

Later life 
After the war, d'Alquen denied any knowledge of Nazi extermination camps. He was sentenced to 10 years in prison.

In July 1955, d'Alquen was sentenced by a Berlin Denazification court to pay a fine of 60,000 DM, followed by a loss of pension rights for three years. He was found guilty of having played a significant role in war propaganda and incitement against churches, Jews and foreigners in the Nazi state. After further investigation of d'Alquen's income from this activity, he was sentenced to pay another fine of 28,000 DM in January 1958.

According to British intelligence, he was a member of the Naumann circle. In the late 1950s, d'Alquen became a shareholder of a weaving mill in Mönchengladbach.

He died on 15 May 1998 in Mönchengladbach.

Dates of rank 

 SS-Anwärter - 10 April 1931
 SS-Mann - 10 April 1931
 SS-Sturmführer - 1 October 1932
 SS-Obersturmführer - 9 November 1933
 SS-Hauptsturmführer - 1 June 1934
 SS-Sturmbannführer - 30 January 1935
 SS-Obersturmbannführer - 16 October 1935
 SS-Standartenführer - 1 January 1937
 SS-Untersturmführer der Reserve - 1 March 1940
 SS-Obersturmbannführer der Reserve - 30 April 1940
 SS-Hauptsturmführer der Reserve - 1 August 1940
 SS-Sturmbannführer der Reserve - 9 November 1941
 SS-Obersturmbannführer der Reserve - 10 August 1943
 SS-Standartenführer der Reserve - 1943

Awards 

 Iron Cross, 2nd class
 War Merit Cross, 2nd class
 General Assault Badge
 Golden Party Badge of the NSDAP
 SS-Ehrenring and SS-Ehrendegen

See also 
 Das Schwarze Korps
 SS-Standarte Kurt Eggers
 Kurt Eggers

References

External links

Books by Gunter d’Alquen (in German)
Gunter d'Alquen auf der Familien (in German)

1910 births
1998 deaths
Nazi Party officials
SS-Standartenführer
Writers from Essen
Nazi propagandists
Sturmabteilung personnel
People from the Rhine Province
German people of Spanish descent
German people of Flemish descent
Waffen-SS personnel
Military personnel from Essen
Hitler Youth members
Anti-Masonry
Antisemitism in Germany
German war correspondents
Fascist writers
German anti-communists
Recipients of the War Merit Cross
Recipients of the Iron Cross, 2nd class
German non-fiction writers
German people of World War II
German propagandists
German prisoners of war in World War II held by the United Kingdom